The Third Age Foundation is an organisation which was set up in 1993, and is based in London, United Kingdom. TAFs' main objective is to help disadvantaged people (40+) find a new direction, upskill them in up-to-date computer technology, including personal development and an action plan in an innovative holistic way. Students are regarded as mature, experienced people, who through no fault of their own, have been out of work or who are in work but "vulnerable", either because they have been made redundant or forced into early retirement or are about to do so, or for other or domestic reasons have had a career break and are having difficulty finding work or extra work - mainly because of their age.

TAFs ethos is based upon the premise that age discrimination against older people makes no economic sense - especially as half of the UK population is over 40. Recent findings regarding the future of state pensions in the UK and because people are living longer and are fitter than ever before, show that we are probably likely to have another 30 – 40 years of active life ahead. By helping students assess their lives, by motivating them, and showing them how to decide what path they should follow next to achieve their goals, as well as training them in Information Technology using up-to-date packages for a recognised qualification in Office e.g.Word Processing (Word), Spreadsheets (Excel), Database (Access),and/or New Media e.g. DTP, Website Design, Powerpoint, Photoshop, as well as a quick introduction to the E-Mail and Internet, Third Age has been very successful in finding a role for a large number of their students and thus helping the country's economy. Pensioners and mature students can learn computer skills working to achieve the ICT Skills for Life qualification.

At the end of the programme students are able to compete in today's job market and have the confidence to challenge age discrimination. About 50% of students get back into an economic role, be it in full/part-time/contract/temporary work, self-employment, volunteering or mentoring in the local community.

External links 

 Third Age Foundation website

Non-profit organisations based in the United Kingdom